Laura Krafft is a comedic writer and actress.  An ImprovOlympic and Second City alum, she is a former staff writer for The Colbert Report.

Writing assignments 
Call Me Kat (2021)
The Colbert Report (2006-2008)
Bust Magazine Columnist, "News from a Broad", (2006, present)
Crossballs: The Debate Show (2004)

Vocal work 
Bateman 365
Dante's Inferno (2007 film)
WireTap
Mystery Show  Case #1 Video Store

Appearances 
Curb Your Enthusiasm
Weekends at the D.L.

External links 

IO West review

American humorists
Writers Guild of America Award winners
Living people
Year of birth missing (living people)